The men's 20 kilometres walk event at the 2022 African Championships in Athletics was held on 12 August in Port Louis, Mauritius.

Results

References

2022 African Championships in Athletics
Racewalking at the African Championships in Athletics